The 2017–18 Prince Mohammad bin Salman League was the 1st season of the Prince Mohammad bin Salman League under its current name, and 41st season of the Saudi First Division since its establishment in 1976. The season started on 12 September 2017 and concluded on 18 April 2018.

Overview

First Division rebranding
On 19 September 2017, the General Sports Authority announced a rebrand; beginning with the 2017–18 season, the competition was known as the Prince Faisal bin Fahd League. As part of the rebranding, a new logo was introduced. On 9 February 2018, the General Sports Authority once again announced a rebrand; starting from the current season, the competition will be known as the Prince Mohammad bin Salman League.

Rule changes
On 11 September 2017, the SAFF announced that the numbers of foreign players were increased from 2 players to 3 players. They also announced that the allowed number of substitutions per match was increased from 3 to 5.

Teams
A total of 16 teams are contesting the league, including 11 sides from the 2016–17 season, two relegated from the 2016–17 Professional League, and three promoted from the 2016–17 Second Division.

Al-Kawkab and Jeddah became the first two clubs to be promoted to the First Division, with both clubs finishing as group winners. Al-Mujazzel became the third and final club to be promoted, following a 5–1 win over Al-Ansar on 3 March 2017, to secure their return to the First Division after only a season's absence. Al-Kawkab returned to the First Division for the first time since the 2013–14 season, and Jeddah will play in their first-ever season in the First Division since being re-branded.

On 20 April 2017, Al-Wehda became the first side to be relegated from the Pro League following a 2–1 home defeat to Al-Fateh. This will be Al-Wehda's first season back to the First Division since the 2014–15 season. On 4 May 2017, Al-Khaleej were the 2nd side to be relegated from the Pro League after a 2–2 draw with Al-Faisaly, finishing 13th in the league. This will also be Al-Khaleej's first season back to the First Division since the 2013–14 season.

On 27 April 2017 Wej became the first club to be relegated to the Second Division following 2–1 defeat to Hajer. On the final matchday, both Al-Adalh and Al-Jeel were relegated to the Second Division, with both clubs drawing their matches.

Team changes
The following teams have changed division since the 2016–17 season.

To Prince Mohammad bin Salman League 
Promoted from Second Division
 Al-Kawkab
 Jeddah
 Al-Mujazzel

Relegated from Professional League
 Al-Khaleej
 Al-Wehda

From Prince Mohammad bin Salman League 
Relegated to Second Division
 Al-Adalh
 Al-Jeel
 Wej

Promoted to Professional League
 Al-Feiha
 Ohod

Stadia and locations

1:  Najran will play at Prince Sultan bin Abdul Aziz Stadium due to the ongoing war in Yemen.

League table

Positions by round
The table lists the positions of teams after each week of matches. In order to preserve chronological evolvements, any postponed matches are not included in the round at which they were originally scheduled but added to the full round they were played immediately afterward.

Results

Season progress

Relegation play-offs
On March 7, 2018, the Saudi Football Federation announced that the number of teams in the Prince Mohammad bin Salman League will be increased from 16 teams to 20 teams. The relegation was removed and in its place, they announced a relegation play-off. The bottom 3 teams will face the 4th place team in each group and the best 5th team in a two-legged match.

Najran won 2–1 on aggregate.

Abha won 2–1 on aggregate.

3–3 on aggregate. Jeddah won 4–1 on penalties.

Statistics

Scoring

Top scorers

Hat-tricks

Clean sheets

Notes

References

Saudi First Division League seasons
Saudi
2